TV AlHijrah is a state-owned Malaysian free-to-air Islamic television channel, owned and operated by Al-Hijrah Media Corporation, a company under the purview of the Department of Islamic Development Malaysia of the Prime Minister's Department. It broadcasts from its headquarters in the Islamic Centre Complex, Kuala Lumpur. The station’s management team is headed by Namanzee Harris as Chief Executive Officer and supervised by the Board Of Directors.

History

TV AlHijrah began its operations on 1 November 2010 on a trial basis. It was a government initiative to establish a channel based on Islam and to provide an Islamic perspective through its programs.

The station was officially launched on the 1st Muharram 1432H (1 December 2010) in a ceremony by the sixth Prime Minister, Najib Tun Razak. The event took place at the TV AlHijrah Digital Broadcasting Centre, Islamic Centre Complex, Kuala Lumpur.

TV AlHijrah broadcasts 24 hours everyday, and is watched globally for Muslim content, the latest news, political commentaries, educational material and Islamic-related entertainment.

References

External links
 
 Official Video On Demand of TV AlHijrah (Malaysia & International Content)

2010 establishments in Malaysia
Television stations in Malaysia
Islamic television networks
Television channels and stations established in 2010
Mass media in Kuala Lumpur
Prime Minister's Department (Malaysia)